Midia is a monotypic genus of dwarf spiders containing the single species, Midia midas. It was first described by Michael I. Saaristo & J. Wunderlich in 1995.

See also
 List of Linyphiidae species (I–P)

References

Linyphiidae
Monotypic Araneomorphae genera